The 1977 Football Championship of Ukrainian SSR was the 47th season of association football competition of the Ukrainian SSR, which was part of the Soviet Second League in Zone 2. The season started on 3 April 1977.

The 1977 Football Championship of Ukrainian SSR was won by SKA Odessa.

The "Ruby Cup" of Molod Ukrayiny newspaper (for the most scored goals) was received by SKA Odessa.

Teams

Location map

Relegated teams 
 none

Promoted and admitted teams 
 FC Desna Chernihiv – (returning after six seasons; replaced the promoted FC Khimik Chernihiv)
 FC Torpedo Lutsk – (returning after four seasons; reinstated and admitted)
 FC Dnipro Cherkasy – (returning after three seasons; reinstated and admitted)

Relocated and renamed teams 
 SC Chernihiv was moved back to Kiev and changed its name to SKA Kiev.
 SC Lutsk was moved back to Lviv and changed its name to SKA Lviv.
 FC Speranța Drochia was moved from the Zone 1 (Soviet republics) to the Zone 2 (Ukraine).
 FC Avtomobilist Zhytomyr changed its name to FC Spartak Zhytomyr.

Final standings

Top goalscorers 
The following were the top ten goalscorers.

See also 
 Soviet Second League

Notes

References

External links 
 1977 Soviet Second League, Zone 2 (Ukrainian SSR football championship). Luhansk football portal
 1977 Soviet championships (all leagues) at helmsoccer.narod.ru

1977
3
Soviet
Soviet
football
Football Championship of the Ukrainian SSR